Rudolf Elias Peersen (28 April 1868 – 5 February 1949) was a Norwegian lawyer and politician.

Peersen was born in Kristiansand on 28 April 1868, the son of Jens P. Peersen and Tomine Margrethe Ommundsen. He studied law at the University of Kristiania from 1888 to 1892. He became active in politics on the left, both locally and nationally. He was a member of Kristiansand city council at various times from 1905 to 1945, including being mayor from 1938 to 1940 and again in 1945. He represented Kristiansand in the national parliament from 1913 to 1919, briefly serving as Minister of Defence for a few months in 1919. He served as a member of the parliament again from 1930 to 1936. He was a member of the Norwegian Association for Women's Rights.

References

1868 births
1949 deaths
Norwegian Association for Women's Rights people
Politicians from Kristiansand
Defence ministers of Norway